Huntington is both a surname and a Christian name. Notable people with the name include:

Surname:
 A. K. Huntington (1852–1920), British professor of metallurgy and aviation pioneer
 Anna Hyatt Huntington (1876–1973), American sculptor
 Annette Huntington, New Zealand nursing academic
 Arabella Huntington, wife of Collis Potter Huntington
 Archer Milton Huntington (1870–1955), scholar of Hispanic Studies
 Benjamin Huntington (1736–1800), American jurist and politician
 Benjamin N. Huntington (1816–1882), American farmer, banker, and politician
 Charles A. Huntington (1891–1973), American quarterback and coach
 Charles Pratt Huntington (1871–1919), American architect
 Collis Potter Huntington (1821–1900), American railroad magnate
 Cynthia Huntington, American poet
 Daniel Huntington (artist) (1816–1906), American artist
 Daniel Riggs Huntington (1871–1962), American architect
 Ebenezer Huntington (1754–1834), United States Representative from Connecticut
 Edward Vermilye Huntington (1874–1952), American mathematician
 Elisha Huntington (1796–1865), Lieutenant Governor for the Commonwealth of Massachusetts from 1853 to 1854
 Ellsworth Huntington (1876–1947), American geographer
 Frank Atwood Huntington (1836–1925), American inventor
 Frederic Dan Huntington (1819–1904), first Protestant Episcopal bishop of Central New York
 George Huntington (disambiguation), several people
 George Huntington, provided an early comprehensive description of Huntington's disease
 George Huntington (Steuben County, NY) (1796–1866), New York politician
 George Huntington Hartford (1833–1917), American businessman, of A&P supermarkets
 George Sumner Huntington (1861–1927), American physician
 Henry E. Huntington (1850–1927), railroad magnate and business leader
 Henry of Huntington, English historian of the 12th century and archdeacon of Huntingdon
 Jabez Huntington (colonist) (1719–1786), a merchant of Connecticut Colony
 Jabez W. Huntington (1788–1847), United States Representative and United States Senator from Connecticut 
 James Otis Sargent Huntington (1854–1935), founder of the Order of the Holy Cross, an Anglican Benedictine monastic order 
 Jedediah Huntington (1743–1818), American general in the Continental Army during the American Revolutionary War
 Jedediah Vincent Huntington (1815–1862), clergyman, novelist
 Joshua Huntington (1786–1819), a Boston clergyman
 Kayla Huntington, fictional character on the ABC television series, Desperate Housewives
 Louise Huntington (1904–1997), stage and screen actress 
 Lucius Seth Huntington (1827–1886), Quebec lawyer, journalist and political figure
 Maria Huntington (born 1997), Finnish athlete
 Nora Huntington, a fictional character on the ABC television series, Desperate Housewives 
 Paul Huntington (born 1987), English footballer
 Presendia Lathrop Huntington, sixth woman to marry LDS Church founder Joseph Smith, Jr.
 Robert Kingsbury Huntington, naval aviator and member of Torpedo Squadron 8 (VT-8) 
 Ron Huntington (1921–1998), Canadian politician
 Rosie Huntington-Whiteley (born 1987), British model, actor
 Sam Huntington (born 1982), American actor
 Samuel Huntington (disambiguation), several people
 Selina Hastings, Countess of Huntingdon (1707–1791), English countess
 William R. Huntington (1907–1990), American architect and Quaker representative to the United Nations and director of the UN Quaker program
 Huntington baronets, a title in the Baronetage of England (1906-1928)

Given name:
 Huntington Hardisty (1929–2003), United States Navy admiral
 Huntington Hartford, A&P supermarket heir
 Huntington Willard, American geneticist
 Huntington Wilson (1875–1946), American diplomat and writer

English-language surnames